Animax was a Latin American cable television channel, serving as the regional variant of the Japanese network of the same name. It was launched on 31 July 2005, replacing Locomotion, which was acquired by Sony on 18 January of the same year. Animax was divided into four feeds: three in Spanish (each centred on Venezuela, Mexico and Argentina) and one in Portuguese (Brazil).

The channel was replaced by Sony Spin on 1 May 2011, which continued airing anime until 5 March 2012.

History

Being Sony's first attempt to offer a 24-hour anime channel in Latin America, it planned to broadcast series in two formats. The majority of the series containing 25 episodes or more, would be aired on weekdays, whereas series with fewer than 25 episodes would be shown on certain days of the week, much like it's done in Japan. It is usual to find in one day a premiere episode of a series as well as a minimal  of two encores. Also, at the end of every series, the channel airs a section called Animedia, which shows video clips of Japanese artists' songs, extra information about anime and other themes, summaries of events dedicated to anime and presentations about future series for the channel. In January 2007, it began to air a segment called Animax Nius (Nius = News), a teaser featuring news related to anime and other topics.

In 2011, anime was moved to late nights, as Western programming took over most of Animax's airtime. On May 1, 2011, the channel was renamed Sony Spin, and changed almost the entirety of its programming.

Programming

TV series

Anime TV series

Anime movies
 Tokyo Godfathers
 Cowboy Bebop: Knockin' on Heaven's Door
 Final Fantasy VII: Advent Children

Translation and dubbing teams

Several dubbing studios have participated in the translation of the aforementioned series for their premiere on Animax, and are located in key countries like Mexico, Brazil, Argentina, Colombia and Venezuela. After Animax's arrival in 2005, numerous series were translated and dubbed into Spanish and Portuguese languages, including Blood+, The Twelve Kingdoms, Steel Angel Kurumi, Noir, Wolf's Rain, Martian Successor Nadesico, Galaxy Angel and others.

References 

Animax
Defunct television channels
Latin American cable television networks
Defunct television channels and networks in Venezuela
Defunct television channels in Brazil
Anime television
Television channels and stations established in 2005
Television channels and stations disestablished in 2011